Chukotsky District (Čukótskiy rayón; Chukchi: , Čukotkakèn rajon) is an administrative and municipal district (raion), one of the six in Chukotka Autonomous Okrug, Russia. It is the easternmost district of the autonomous okrug and Russia, and the closest part of Russia to the United States. It borders with the Chukchi Sea in the north, the Bering Sea in the east, Providensky District in the south, and the Kolyuchinskaya Bay in the west. Its administrative center is the rural locality (a selo) of Lavrentiya. Population:  The population of Lavrentiya accounts for 30.2% of the district's total population.

The district is populated mainly by indigenous peoples, the majority being either Chukchi or Yupik. The sparse nature of the population means that this is the only district in the autonomous okrug without any urban localities. The selo of Uelen is located in the district, which is a focal point for indigenous artwork of the region as a whole and the birthplace of Yuri Rytkheu, the first internationally recognized Chukchi writer.

Geography

Chukotsky District covers the northern half of the Chukchi Peninsula, at the northeastern tip of Eurasia. Prior to 1957, the district was substantially larger, as its territory covered not only present-day Chukotsky District, but also present-day Providensky District, as well as a substantial territory now included in Iultinsky District.

Uelen—the easternmost settlement on the Eurasian landmass and famous for its whale bone carving—is located on the district's territory. It also features the most easterly point on the Eurasian landmass: Cape Dezhnev, named after Russian navigator Semyon Dezhnyov. It was formerly the setting for a Dalstroy gulag site and the alleged starting point for Clemens Forell's epic journey in the novel As Far as My Feet Will Carry Me.

Lakes Koolen and Ioni are located in the district.

History
For the indigenous peoples, life has been rather static for the last few millennia, judging from archaeological excavations. The region contains about eighty archaeological and historical sites, many of which are in the vicinity of present-day villages.

From the view of non-indigenous people, the area now known as Chukotsky District was a formidable place and was only gradually and tentatively explored in comparison with other areas of Chukotka. Semyon Dezhnyov and his Cossacks nearly had their entire fleet destroyed as they attempted to sail around the cape that would ultimately bear his name on their way to the Anadyr River in the mid-17th century. Eighty years later, Vitus Bering sailed through the strait which now bears his name, and five years later, the first maps of the coastline were drawn by the Second Kamchatka Expedition. However, it was not for a further fifty-five years that the coast of the region was visited by James Cook, and a permanent Russian presence in the form of trading posts in any of the villages was not established until the early 1900s.

Prior to the establishment of the current administrative arrangement (with Chukotsky District as it is now being founded in 1927), Chukotsky Uyezd was founded with its seat in Provideniya Bay in 1909, and in 1912, the seat was moved to Uelen with one of the first schools in the area opening there four years later.

Historical sites in Chukotsky District
There were once many indigenous Yupik settlements throughout Chukotsky District; however, at the end of the 1950s, the Soviet government began a substantial program of relocation, closing a large number of indigenous settlements and relocating their inhabitants to a small number of villages. These settlements were destined to become local hubs and model Soviet villages Following the dissolution of the Soviet Union, local indigenous people rely more heavily on their traditional hunting skills and are considering the resettling a number of these villages due to the lack of centralized relocation. The table below outlines some of the more important historical localities within the district.

Demographics
Chukotsky District has the highest percentage of indigenous peoples in the whole of Chukotka, with 85% of people being of native origin. The native peoples are primarily Chukchi, but there are also small populations of Evens, Koryaks, and Yupik.

The remaining 15% of the population is of non-indigenous origin, mainly Russian. These people either migrated to the Far East or are the descendants of those who did, enticed by the higher pay, large pensions, and more generous allowances permitted to those prepared to endure the cold and the isolation, as well as those who were exiled here as a result of the Stalin's purges or after having been released from the gulag.

Economy

Unlike with most other districts of Chukotka Autonomous Okrug, Chukotsky District's economy is much more focused on traditional marine hunting and reindeer herding. This is in part because, at around 85%, Chukotsky District has the highest percentage of indigenous peoples in the autonomous okrug. There is next to no industrial activity in this district, with the population mainly involved in reindeer herding, fishing, and seal hunting, with an administrative program in place to ensure that local indigenous peoples receive material incentives to continue with their traditional way of life.

Culture

Although many native rural localities in the autonomous okrug have historical museums documenting the culture of the indigenous peoples, Chukotsky District has a particularly strong cultural tradition, with Uelen being a notable hub, particularly for whale bone carving. Famous for its walrus ivory carvings, Uelen has long been a major artistic center in the region, with several of the leading exponents of the craft, such as Vukvutagin, Vukvol, Tukkay, and Khukhutan, working out of Uelen. It is also home to an indigenous choir which has a history of cultural collaboration with their Inuit cousins across the Bering Strait in Alaska.

The village also serves as the base for archaeological expeditions to the area, which have uncovered a burial ground containing over three hundred burials of early Whale Hunter cultures, covering a time span from 500 BCE to 1000 CE. These excavations have shown that Uelen was a major settlement in the first centuries CE. In addition to revealing the existence of a culture dependent on whale and walrus hunting, archeologists also unearthed early examples of the indigenous peoples ivory carvings, a number of which are now held at the Peter the Great Museum of Anthropology and Ethnography in St. Petersburg.

The writer Yuri Rytkheu was born in Uelen in 1930 to a family of trappers and hunters and was the first Chukchi author to achieve national prominence. His book A Dream in Polar Fog deals with the Chukchi people's efforts to adapt when a foreigner is shipwrecked on their shores.

The district hosts the dog sled race "Hope" and the sea hunters' "Beringiya" festival.

Administrative and municipal status
Within the framework of administrative divisions, Chukotsky District is one of the six in the autonomous okrug. The selo of Lavrentiya serves as its administrative center. The district does not have any lower-level administrative divisions and has administrative jurisdiction over six rural localities.

As a municipal division, the district is incorporated as Chukotsky Municipal District and is divided into six rural settlements.

Inhabited localities

Divisional source:

*Administrative centers are shown in bold

Gallery

References

Notes

Sources

Petit Futé: Chukotka, Strogoff, M, Brochet, P-C and Auzias, D. "Avant-Garde" Publishing House, 2006.
Provideniya Museum Catalogue, various authors, translated by Bland, R.L., Shared Beringia Heritage Program, National Park Service, U.S. Department of the Interior. April 2002.
Igor Krupnik and Mikhail Chlenov (2007). The end of “Eskimo land”: Yupik relocation in Chukotka, 1958-1959 Études/Inuit/Studies 31 (1-2)

Districts of Chukotka Autonomous Okrug
Northeast Asia